Lukas Christian is a paralympic athlete from Switzerland competing mainly in category T42 sprint events.

Biography
Lukas is a three time Paralympian who in that time has won a total of five gold medals.  His first appearance came in 1992 Summer Paralympics where he won silver in both the 100m and 200m for the TS 1 class.  He improved in the 1996 Summer Paralympics winning the gold medal in the 100m, 200m and long jump.  In the 2000 Summer Paralympics he defended his 200m and long jump titles and managed second place in the 100m.

References

Paralympic athletes of Switzerland
Athletes (track and field) at the 1992 Summer Paralympics
Athletes (track and field) at the 1996 Summer Paralympics
Athletes (track and field) at the 2000 Summer Paralympics
Paralympic gold medalists for Switzerland
Paralympic silver medalists for Switzerland
Living people
Medalists at the 1992 Summer Paralympics
Medalists at the 1996 Summer Paralympics
Medalists at the 2000 Summer Paralympics
Year of birth missing (living people)
Paralympic medalists in athletics (track and field)
Swiss male sprinters
Swiss male long jumpers
Sprinters with limb difference
Long jumpers with limb difference
Paralympic sprinters
Paralympic long jumpers